Sulima is a town in the extreme south east of Sierra Leone, lying at the mouth of the Moa River.  Originally a trading post in the nineteenth century, it has a large population of refugees from Liberia.

Transport 
In 2013, Sulima is the proposed site of a new port for the export of iron ore from Tonkolili.

See also 
 Railway stations in Sierra Leone

References 

Populated places in Sierra Leone
Southern Province, Sierra Leone